Putún or Chontal Maya is a collective name for several groups of Maya that displaced much of the older leadership of the Maya Lowlands during the Late Classic and Postclassic.  The Putún, who came from the Gulf coast in the northwest region of the Maya area, are generally held to have been more Mexicanized than their contemporaries.   They were associated with the Puuc architectural style and distinctive orangeware pottery.  The Itza are often considered a group of Putún Maya.  The contemporary Chontal Maya of Tabasco speak a closely related language.

Notes

References

Maya peoples